Gregory Pakourianos (Grigol Bakurianis-dze; , Gregorios Pakourianos; , Grigor Bakurian) (died 1086) was a Byzantine politician and military commander. He was the founder of the Monastery of the Mother of God Petritzonitissa in Bachkovo and author of its typikon. The monks of this Orthodox monastery were Iberians.

Life

Background

Gregory's origins are a matter for scholarly dispute. He is believed to have hailed from the region of Tao or Tayk, which had been ruled by Georgian Bagratids of kouropalatate of Iberia, later annexed by the Byzantines to the theme of Iberia in 1001. According to Anna Comnena Gregory was "descended from a noble Armenian family." According to N. Aleksidze, the only source that indicates his Armenian origin is Anna Comnena who was only three years old when Gregory died.<ref>Nikoloz Aleksidze. The Narrative of the Caucasian Schism: Memory and Forgetting in Medieval Caucasia, Corpus Scriptorum Christianorum Orientalium. Louvain: Peeters, 2018, pp. 162-163</ref> The 12-century Armenian chronicler Matthew of Edessa, wrote the he was of vrats, or "Georgian," origin, though here he was likely referring to Pakourianos' being part of the Georgian Orthodox Church rather than necessarily being an ethnic Georgian. Gregory himself proclaimed that he belonged to "the glorious people of the Iberians" and insisted his monks to know the Georgian language. Under Byzantine suzerainty, the population of Upper Tao identified itself as 'Georgian'. The élite of Tao (Basil Bagratisdze, P'eris Jojikisdze, Abas and Grigol Bakurianisdze) regarded Georgia as 'our country' and strove for its spiritual, cultural and political prosperity. Thus, he, like other representatives of the elite from the Tao region, considered Georgia his homeland and strove for its spiritual, cultural and political prosperity. 

Taking into account all the evidence available on Pakourianos, the scholar Nina G. Garsoïan proposed that "the most likely explanation is that [the Pakourian family] belonged to the mixed Armeno-Iberian Chalcedonian aristocracy, which dwelt in the border district of Tayk/Tao."

Anna Comnena described Pakourianos as having a tiny frame but being a mighty warrior.

Byzantine service
Since 1060 Gregory served in Byzantine army. In 1064 he had achieved a significant position among the Byzantine military aristocracy, but failed at defending Ani against the Seljuk leader Alp Arslan, King Bagrat IV of Georgia and Albanian King Goridzhan in the same year. Since 1071 he was appointed as a Strategos (governor) of the theme of Iberia. As the Seljuk advance forced the Byzantines to evacuate the eastern Anatolian fortresses and the theme of Iberia, Gregory ceded control over Kars and Tao to King George II of Georgia in 1074. This did not help, however, to stem the Turkish advance and the area became a battleground of the Georgian-Seljuk wars.

Afterwards he served under Michael VII Doukas (1071–78) and Nikephoros III Botaneiates (1078–81) in various responsible positions on both the eastern and the western frontiers of the empire. Later Gregory was involved in a coup that removed Nikephoros III. The new Emperor, Alexios I Komnenos, appointed him "megas domestikos of All the West" and gave him many more properties in the Balkans. He possessed numerous estates in various parts of the Byzantine Empire and was afforded a variety of privileges by the emperor, including exemption from certain taxes. In 1081, he commanded the left flank against the Normans at the Battle of Dyrrachium. A year later he evicted the Normans from Moglena. He died in 1086 fighting  the Pechenegs at the battle of Beliatoba, charging so vigorously he crashed into a tree.

Gregory was also known as a noted patron and promoter of Christian culture. He together with his brother Abas (Apasios) made, in 1074, a significant donation to the Eastern Orthodox Holy Monastery of Iviron on Mount Athos and commissioned the regulations (typikon) for this foundation. He signed the Greek version of the Typikon in Armenian.Paul Lemerle. Le Monde Byzantin. Cinq études sur le XIe siècle Byzantin. Le Typikon de Grégoire Pakourianos (Décembre 1083). Édition CNRS. Paris, 1977, p. 157. He also signed his name in Georgian and Armenian characters rather than Greek. It is assumed that Pakourianos did not know Greek.

Gregory Pakourianos and his brother Abas were buried in a bone-vault house near the Bachkovo Monastery. The portraits of the two brothers are painted on the north wall of the bone-vault house.

Notes

Further reading
 Gregory_Pakourianos. "Typicon Pacuriani (Regula monasterii Petriconi)" (in Old Georgian, written in 1083)
 Chanidze, A., "Au sujet du batisseur de monastere de Petritsoni Grigol Bakourianis-dze (en Bulgarie)," BK 38 (1980), 36; idem, "Le grand domestique de l'occident, Gregorii Bakurianis-dze, et le monastere georgien fonde par lui en Bulgarie," BK 28 (1971), 134
  Arutiunova-Fidanian, V. A. Tipik Grigoriia Pakuriana. Yerevan, 1978.
 Comnena, Anna, “The Alexiad”, Translated by E.R.A. Sewter, Pengium Books Ltd., London, 1969, (reprinted in 2003), pp. 560.
 Petit, L., Typikon de Grégoire Pacourianos pour le monastère de Pétritzos (Bachkovo) en Bulgarie, texte original, Viz. Vrem., XI, Suppl. no 1, SPB 1904, XXXII+63 p.
 Gautier, P. Le typikon du sébaste Grégoire Pakourianos. - Revue des études byzantines, T. 42 (1984), pp. 5-145
  Marr, Nicholas. Н. Я. Марр. Аркаун – монгольское название христиан в связи с вопросом об армянах-халкедонитах (Византийский временник”, т. XII, С. Петербург, 1905. Отдельный оттиск). ( Arkaun, the Mongolian name of Christians in connection with the question of the Armenians-Chalcedonian. Saint-Petersburg, 1905, pp. 17–31 ).
 Obolensky, D., Nationalism in Eastern Europe in the Middle Ages: Transactions of the Royal Historical Society, Fifth Series, Vol. 22, (1972), pp. 1–16
 Ostrogorsky, G., Observations on the Aristocracy in Byzantium: Dumbarton Oaks Papers, Vol. 25, (1971), pp. 1–32
 Shanidze, A., "The Georgian Monastery in Bulgaria and its Typikon: the Georgian Edition of the Typikon" (in Georgian and Russian)," Works 9 (1986), Tbilisi:  Metsniereba. pp. 29-36
 Toumanoff, Cyril. "Caucasia and Byzantium." Traditio'' 27 (1971), pp. 111–152.

11th-century births
1086 deaths
Nobility of Georgia (country)
Armenian nobility
Byzantine generals
Byzantines killed in battle
Byzantine people of Armenian descent
Byzantine people of Georgian descent
11th-century people from Georgia (country)
Generals of Alexios I Komnenos
Domestics of the Schools
Founders of Christian monasteries
Bachkovo Monastery
11th-century Byzantine military personnel